Caerulea is a genus of butterflies in the family Lycaenidae. It is a small genus with only two 
species.
Caerulea coeligena (Oberthür, 1876) western China, central China. 
Caerulea coelestis (Alphéraky, 1897) Tibet, western China

References

"Caerulea Forster, 1938" at Markku Savela's Lepidoptera and some other life forms

External links
Images representing Caerulea at Encyclopedia of Life 

Polyommatini
Lycaenidae genera
Taxa named by Walter Forster (entomologist)